"Hey Young Girl" is the second single from Lloyd's first studio album Southside. The song is produced by Corron Cole. The song is inspired by Slick Rick's "Hey Young World", which the song is sampled from.

They made a music video for the single.
Irv Gotti, Jermaine Dupri, Lil' Scrappy, Jazze Pha, Dallas Austin and Ciara made an appearance in the video.

Near the end of the video Lloyd sang the first verse of one of his other songs on Southside called "Take It Low". Ciara dances with Lloyd in that scene.

Chart position

Release history

References

2004 singles
Lloyd (singer) songs
Song recordings produced by Rodney Jerkins
2004 songs
Universal Music Group singles
Songs written by Lloyd (singer)
Songs written by Slick Rick